The 2014–15 San Francisco Dons men's basketball team represented the University of San Francisco during the 2014–15 NCAA Division I men's basketball season. It was head coach Rex Walters seventh season at San Francisco. The Dons played their home games at the War Memorial Gymnasium and were members of the West Coast Conference. They finished the season 14–18, 7–11 in WCC play to finish in a three way tie for sixth place. They advanced to the quarterfinals of the WCC tournament where they lost to Gonzaga.

Previous season 
The Dons finished the season 21–12, 13–5 in WCC play to finish in a tie for second place. They advanced to the semifinals of the WCC tournament where they lost to BYU. They were invited to the National Invitation Tournament where they lost in the first round to LSU.

Departures

Incoming Transfers

Recruiting Class of 2014

Recruiting Class of 2015

Roster

Schedule and results

|-
!colspan=12 style="background:#006633; color:#FFCC33;"| Non-Conference Regular Season

|-
!colspan=12 style="background:#006633; color:#FFCC33;"| WCC Regular Season

|-
!colspan=12 style="background:#006633; color:#FFCC33;"| WCC tournament

References

San Francisco Dons men's basketball seasons
San Francisco
San Francisco Dons
San Francisco Dons